Bijoy Chandra Bhagavati (20 January 1905 – 8 May 1997) was an Indian politician belonging to the Indian National Congress. He was elected to the Lok Sabha, lower house of the Parliament of India from the Tezpur Assam in 1957, 1962 and 1967. He was national president of INTUC.  He was awarded the Padma Bhushan in 1992.

References

External links
Official biographical sketch in Parliament of India website

Indian National Congress politicians from Assam
India MPs 1957–1962
India MPs 1962–1967
India MPs 1967–1970
Recipients of the Padma Bhushan in public affairs
1905 births
1997 deaths
People from Sonitpur district
Lok Sabha members from Assam